Stanczak is a Polish surname. Notable people with the surname include:
Adrian Stańczak (born 1987), Polish volleyball player
Ed Stanczak (1921–2004), American professional basketball player
Jake Stanczak (born 1981), American disc jockey
Julian Stanczak (born 1928–2017), American painter and printmaker
Piotr Stańczak (died 2009), Polish geologist
Wadeck Stanczak (born 1961), French actor

Polish-language surnames